Simone Fattal (Arabic: سيمون فتال ; born 1942) is a Lebanese-American artist.

She was born in Damascus and was educated in Beirut and Paris, studying philosophy at the Sorbonne. She returned to Beirut in 1969, where she began a career as a painter. She began working in clay at The Art Institute of California, later working in Grasse with ceramic artist Hans Spinner.

She lived with poet and artist Etel Adnan, until Adnan's death in November 2021. The couple left Lebanon for Sausalito, California in 1980. There Fattal established a publishing house Post-Apollo Press. She returned to the visual arts in 1988, producing sculpture, watercolors, paintings and collage. She later moved to Paris.

In 2017, she was nominated for a AWARE prize for women artists.

In 2019, a retrospective of her work "Works and Days" was presented at the Museum of Modern Art's MoMA PS1. Her work has also been exhibited at the Yves Saint Laurent Museum in Marrakesh, at the Rochechouart Museum of Contemporary Art and at the Sharjah Art Foundation.

In April 2021, Fattal assisted an exhibition with Serhan Ada at the Pera Museum in Istanbul of Etel Adnan's work.

'Finding a Way', commissioned by the Whitechapel Gallery, was on view in London between 21 Sep 2021 – 15 May 2022.

References

Further reading

 
 

1942 births
Living people
American women sculptors
Lebanese painters
Lebanese women painters
Lebanese women sculptors
American women painters
American women ceramists
American ceramists
Lebanese women ceramists
Lebanese LGBT people
21st-century American women